Elizabeth Winthrop ( Alsop; born September 14, 1948) is an American writer, the author of more than sixty published books, primarily children's fiction. 

She is best known for the classic middle-grade novel, The Castle in the Attic and its sequel, The Battle for the Castle, which, together, have been nominated for 23 state book awards and are considered children's classics.

Life
Elizabeth Winthrop Alsop was born in Washington, D.C. She is a daughter of the newspaper columnist and political analyst Stewart Alsop and Patricia Alsop, a retired American Red Cross medical research technologist. One of her siblings is investor and pundit Stewart Alsop II. Her uncle was Joseph Alsop. Her grandfather was Joseph Alsop IV (1876–1953), who married Corinne Douglas Robinson (1886–1971). She is a great grandniece of U.S. President Theodore Roosevelt and first-cousin twice removed to Eleanor Roosevelt. Her great-grandmother was Corinne Roosevelt Robinson.

Winthrop graduated from Sarah Lawrence College. She married and divorced once before 2005. On March 26 of that year she married Robert Jason Bosseau, director of the drama program at Riverdale Country School in the Bronx, New York.

Writer
Her memoir, Daughter of Spies: Wartime Secrets, Family Lies was published under her maiden name, Elizabeth Winthrop Alsop by Regal House. Her most recent children's book is Maia and the Monster Baby (Holiday House, 2012) illustrated by Amanda Haley. Her most recent historical novel, Counting on Grace was chosen as a Notable Book of the Year by the American Library Association, the National Council of Social Studies, the International Reading Association and the Children's Book Council among others.

Some of her most popular picture books include Dumpy La Rue, Shoes, Dog Show, Squashed in the Middle, The First Christmas Stocking, and The Biggest Parade.

Selected books
  Daughter of Spies: Wartime Secrets, Family Lies (Regal House, 2022)
  Counting on Grace, Jane Adams Peace Prize
 Squashed in the Middle Illustrated by Pat Cummings (Henry Holt, 2005) ALA Notable Book
  The Battle for the Castle (Yearling, 1994)
  The Castle in the Attic (Yearling, 1985) Dorothy Canfield Fisher Children's Book Award

Complete list of books
 Daughter of Spies: Wartime Secrets, Family Lies , Elizabeth Winthrop Alsop, 9781646032747
 Island Justice (new eBook format, 2012); ASIN B007VSRBVU
 Island Justice (William Morrow, 1998);,  EBook, 
 My First Book of the Planets (Western Pub.
 Grover Sleeps Over (Sesame Street, A Growing Up Book) (Western Pub.
 The Shoelace Box (Golden Press, 1984), Illustrated by Kathy Wilburn; 
 Miranda in the Middle (Holiday House, 1980); 
 Are You Sad, Mama? (Harper and Row, 1979), Illustrated Donna Diamond; 	
 Journey to the Bright Kingdom (Holiday House, 1979), Illustrated by Charles Mikolaycak; 	
 Marathon Miranda (Holiday House, 1979); 

References

External links

Winthrop at GoodReads.com

American children's writers
American people of Dutch descent
Living people
Bulloch family
Roosevelt family
Schuyler family
1948 births
Alsop family